The 1894 Amateur Hockey Association of Canada season lasted from January 5 until March 10. The season ended with a four-way tie, necessitating a playoff to decide the league and Stanley Cup championships. The Montreal Hockey Club defeated the Ottawa Hockey Club in the final playoff game to claim the title.

Executive 

 President - Watson Jack, Victorias
 First Vice Pres. - A. Laurie, Quebec
 Second Vice Pres. - Weldy C. Young, Ottawa
 Secretary-Treasurer - J. A. Findlay, Montreal

Season

Highlights 
In two games players scored five goals. In the opening game, in which Montreal soundly defeated Quebec 7–0, Haviland Routh scored five. On January 20, Bert Russel of Ottawa scored five.

Final standing

Playoffs 
The first Stanley Cup playoff game occurred on March 17, 1894. At the end of the 1894 AHAC season, four teams tied for the AHA championship with records of 5–3–0. This created problems for the AHA governors and the Cup's trustees since there was no tie-breaking system in place. After long negotiation and the withdrawal of Quebec from the championship situation, it was decided that a three-team tournament would take place in Montreal, with Ottawa getting a bye to the finals (being the sole "road" team). The Montreal HC defeated the Montreal Victorias, 3 – 2. Five days later on March 22, 1894, Montreal successfully defended their title with a 3 – 1 win over Ottawa. The OHA champion Osgoode Hall challenged for the Cup, but this was abandoned due to the lack of natural ice.

Game one: Montreal Hockey Club vs. Montreal Victorias 

Ice conditions were described as not very good. The game was considered exciting, however, with Haviland Routh and Billy Barlow starring.

Game one rosters

Game two: Ottawa Hockey Club vs. Montreal Hockey Club 

The final was close and in doubt until Billy Barlow scored the winning goal at 9'00" of the third quarter.

According to the Globe report of the game:

"Team play was marred by the softness of the ice. Rough and foul play was frequent, both defences indulging freely in tripping and slashing. Young of Ottawa was injured by James in the second half and although he finished the game without apparent distress, fainted dead away at the end of it. After the match the victors were carried off the rink."

Game two rosters

Schedule and results

Player statistics

Goaltending averages 
Note: GP = Games played, GA = Goals against, SO = Shutouts, GAA = Goals against average

Scoring leaders 
Note: GP = games played, G = Goals scored.

Stanley Cup engraving

1894 Montreal Hockey Club

See also 
 List of pre-NHL seasons
 List of Stanley Cup champions

References

Bibliography

Notes

External links 
 description of first Stanley Cup final on Backcheck

AHAC
Amateur Hockey Association of Canada seasons